The Living Colombia Movement (Movimiento Colombia Viva) is a political party in Colombia. The party took part in the parliamentary elections of 2006, in which the movement won 166 deputy seats and two senators out of one hundred.

External links
www.movimientocolombiaviva.org  

Political parties in Colombia